Berginus pumilus is a species of hairy fungus beetle in the family Mycetophagidae. It is found in Central America and North America.

References

Further reading

 
 
 
 
 

Tenebrionoidea
Beetles described in 1863